Nürəddin (also, Nurəddin and Noradin) is a village in the Lachin Rayon of Azerbaijan.

The villages next to Nürəddin are Fərraş Suvat Kalafalıq Ardıclı Bozgüney Hagnəzər Vaqazin Piçənis Ağcayazı Ərdəşəvi 

There is a secondary school of Nürəddin village. Primary school of this village was called Arduşlu (Ardushlu).

References 

Populated places in Lachin District